Attila Fekete may refer to:

 Attila Fekete (fencer) (born 1974), Hungarian fencer
 Attila Fekete (footballer) (born 1987), Hungarian footballer